+ - (pronounced "plus minus") is the sixth studio album by Danish alternative rock band Mew. It was released on 24 April 2015. The album was produced by Michael Beinhorn and was promoted by the singles "Satellites" and "Water Slides". It was Mew's first studio album in five-and-a-half years, following their 2009 record No More Stories.... Bassist Johan Wohlert made his return on this album after being absent from the band's previous album following his departure in 2006. + - was also the final album to feature guitarist Bo Madsen, who left the band on 1 July 2015, as well as the final album to featured original formation.

Recording and release
The recording process for + - started in May 2013 in Copenhagen. Mew enlisted the help of American producer Michael Beinhorn, with whom they worked on their fourth studio album, And the Glass Handed Kites (2005).
They also invited guitarist Russell Lissack of the British rock band Bloc Party, whom they first met years earlier during a joint US concert tour, to take part in the writing process and play on the album. Lissack was featured on the track "My Complications".

The release date for the album was announced on 19 January 2015 as 27 April 2015, simultaneously releasing "Satellites" as the first single.
The album was issued as a CD, a heavyweight gatefold double 12" vinyl and a limited edition deluxe double CD book, as well as digitally, with iTunes Store pre-order starting in January.

On 2 February 2015, "The Night Believer" was premiered on Norwegian radio station NRK P3. The song features guest vocals by New Zealand singer-songwriter Kimbra.

The album's second single "Water Slides" was released on 16 March 2015.  On 3 April 2015, Mew premiered the song "Witness".

Critical reception

Upon its release, the album received favourable reviews from music critics. At Metacritic, which assigns a normalized rating out of 100 to reviews from mainstream critics, the album received an average score of 78, based on 17 reviews.

Ian Cohen of Pitchfork commented that "+- is liable to be one of the more magnificent-sounding rock records you’ll hear all year."

Commercial performance
The album debuted at number one in Denmark, becoming Mew's second number-one album. In the United Kingdom, + - debuted at number 59 on the UK Albums Chart with first-week sales of 1,438 copies. It is the band's highest-charting album since Frengers (2003) charted at number 102.

Track listing

Personnel
Mew
Jonas Bjerre – vocals, keyboards
Bo Madsen – guitar, backing vocals
Johan Wohlert – bass, backing vocals
Silas Utke Graae Jørgensen – drums, percussion

Additional personnel
Michael Beinhorn – production
Christian Alex Petersen – Engineer
Rich Costey – mixing
Christian Alex Petersen – Mixing
Nick Watts – keyboards
Russell Lissack – guitar (track 6)
Kimbra – vocals (track 3), backing vocals (tracks 7–8)
Sasha Ryabina – backing vocals (tracks 1, 2, 5, 10)

Charts

Release history

References

2015 albums
Mew (band) albums
Albums produced by Michael Beinhorn